Charuymaq-e Markazi Rural District is in the Central District of Charuymaq County, East Azerbaijan province, Iran. At the National Census of 2006, its population was 6,444 in 1,266 households. There were 5,429 inhabitants in 1,511 households at the following census of 2011. At the most recent census of 2016, the population of the rural district was 5,194 in 1,574 households. The largest of its 53 villages was Uch Daraq, with 420 people.

References 

Charuymaq County

Rural Districts of East Azerbaijan Province

Populated places in East Azerbaijan Province

Populated places in Charuymaq County